Xie Na (born May 6, 1981), also known as "Nana," is a Chinese host, singer and actress. She is famous for co-hosting the Hunan Satellite TV program Happy Camp with fellow hosts He Jiong, Li Weijia, Du Haitao, and Wu Xin. She graduated from Sichuan Normal University, where she majored in performance. She has over one hundred and thirty million followers on Weibo as of June 2021, making her one of the most widely followed celebrities in China.

Career

Xie Na arrived in Beijing at age 18 to pursue a career in the entertainment industry. Prior to becoming a host, Xie Na started her career as an actress, starring in movies, TV series and stage productions. In 2006, she released her autobiography Na Shi Yi Zhen Feng (Chinese: 娜是一阵疯). In 2008, her second book Na Xie Nian Hua (Chinese: 娜写年华) was published. Xie Na also released her debut album 'Bo Luo Bo Luo Mi' (Chinese: 菠萝菠萝蜜) in 2006; she is signed with Huayi Brothers.

Xie Na founded her personal clothing line "HUANXING" on October 15, 2010, with a flagship store in Taobao Mall online. The brand has been worn by Zhang Jie(her husband), He Jiong, Su Xing, Cao Ying, and other celebrities.

Personal life
On May 5, 2011, Xie Na and singer Jason Zhang registered their marriage in Chengdu, China. Their wedding ceremony was held on September 26, 2011, in Shangri-La City.

In July 2013, Xie Na attended Boston University's Center for English Language & Orientation Programs (CELOP) for a 6-week program to improve her English skills.

On February 1, 2018, she gave birth to twin daughters.

Filmography

Film

TV series

Discography

In addition to releasing her own music, in 2010, Xie Na also participated in Happy Camp's album You'll See the Happiness (Chinese: 快乐你懂的), as one of the hosts for the show.

Awards

Books
Na Shi Yi Zhen Feng (Chinese:娜是一阵疯) (2006)
 Na Xie Nian Hua (Chinese:娜些年华) (2008)
 Na Me Kuai Le (Chinese:娜么快乐) (2012)

References

External links
 

1980 births
Living people
Actresses from Sichuan
Chinese stage actresses
Chinese voice actresses
Chinese television presenters
Chinese autobiographers
Writers from Deyang
People's Republic of China writers
Women autobiographers
21st-century Chinese women writers
Chinese film actresses
Chinese television actresses
21st-century Chinese women singers
Chinese women television presenters